Tamily Weissman-Unni (born January 21, 1971) is a neurobiology professor at Lewis and Clark College in Portland Oregon. She has published numerous studies on brain development and her current research focuses on formation of cerebellar circuits. Additionally, she has won several scientific imaging competitions for her striking multi-color pictures of the brain.

Personal background and education 
Tamily was born in England but immigrated with her family to Seattle, Washington, in her early childhood. She went on to earn a degree in psychology from Pomona College (1992) and a PhD in neurobiology from Columbia University (2004). Together with Dr. Jeff W. Lichtman, Dr. Jean Livet, Dr. Josh R. Sanes, and others at Harvard University she helped develop the 'Brainbow' transgenic mouse line.

References 

Educators from Seattle
Columbia University alumni
Pomona College alumni
Lewis & Clark College faculty
Living people
1972 births
American women academics
21st-century American women